Thiruvannamalai is a 2008 Indian Tamil-language masala film written and directed by Perarasu. It stars Arjun Sarja, Pooja Gandhi, Karunas, Sai Kumar and Vidharth. The music was composed by Srikanth Deva. The film was later dubbed in Hindi as Main Hoon Vinashak and in Telugu as Jai Sambasiva.

Plot
Easwaran (Arjun Sarja) is an upright, honest youth who runs a local cable channel in Kumbakonam. He is known to fight for causes of the society and the common man. He enters into fisticuffs with local MLA Poongundran (Sai Kumar) after he exposes his corrupt and greedy ways through his cable TV channel. Fearing trouble, his mother Alamelu (Sudha) takes him to a saint in Thiruvannamalai. Guruji resembles Easwaran. A sequence of events forces them to swap places. The soft-spoken Swami tries to sort all issues through non-violent means (Gandhian philosophy). Halfway through, Duraisingam (Karunas) dies in the hands of Poongundran and Poovarasu (Vidharth). In the climax, Guruji kills Poongundran.

Cast

 Arjun Sarja as Easwaran / Guruji
 Pooja Gandhi as Malathi
 Karunas as Duraisingam
 Sai Kumar as MLA Poongundran
 Akila as Easwaran sister
 Vidharth as Poovarasu
 Vaiyapuri as Thumbi Singaram
 Chitti Babu as Poongundran's sidekick
 Sudha as Alamelu
 Saravana Subbiah as Police inspector
 Pala. Karuppiah as Local Politician
 Bharathi Kannan as Pandian
 Periyar Dasan
 Munnar Ramesh
 Vellai Subbaiah
 Suja Varunee as Special appearance
 Perarasu as Dr. Swamy Malai (Cameo appearance)

Soundtrack
The music was composed by Srikanth Deva and Released by Divo. All lyrics written by Perarasu.

Production
Immediately after the release of Pazhani in January 2008, Perarasu announced that he would make another action film starring Bharath titled Thiruthani. However the actor's commitment to Durai's Nepali and Venkatesh's Killadi meant that he was unable to start the project at the time, so Perarasu announced his next project Thiruvannamalai with Arjun Sarja.

Sanya Vakil was selected to play the lead heroine but she opted out. instead Pooja Gandhi was selected.

Reception

Indiaglitz wrote: "Though the screenplay and script are quick-paced, several sequences sans logic fails to attract attention". Behindwoods wrote: "Thiruvannamalai is a full length Arjun action show in true Perarasu style". Kollywoodtoday wrote: "On the whole, it’s a ridiculous film to watch for  audiences who are fond of watching avant-garde filmmakers". Sify wrote: "The plodding plot by Perarasu is a rehash of so many films and is as stale as day before yesterday’s Sambar! It follows the hoary formula of all mass masalas, and there is not even one scene or dialogue which is original". Cinefundas wrote: "On the whole, Perarasu makes you feel that he has done something different on the interval where a great challenge is established between two characters. But with everyone anticipating that the screenplay would be sans stunts, it’s completely letting down us with a regretful work".

References

Films directed by Perarasu
2008 films
Indian action films
2000s masala films
2000s Tamil-language films
Films scored by Srikanth Deva
2008 action films